The Nho Quế River is a river of Vietnam and China. It flows through Hà Giang Province, Cao Bằng Province and China for 192 kilometres. The river has a basin area of 6052 square kilometres,

References 

Rivers of Cao Bằng province
Rivers of Hà Giang province
Rivers of Yunnan
Geography of Wenshan Zhuang and Miao Autonomous Prefecture
Rivers of Vietnam